Denis Aleksandrovich Kornilov (born 17 August 1986) is a Russian ski jumper who has competed at World Cup level since 2003.

Career
Kornilov's best individual World Cup result is fifth in Bischofshofen on 6 January 2008, and in Sapporo on 3 February 2008. His best team result is second in Oberstdorf on 15 February 2009.

At the World Championships, his best individual result is 16th in 2011; his best team result is fifth in 2005. Kornilov has competed at four Winter Olympics, with his individual result being 24th and his best team result being seventh, both in 2018.

References

1986 births
Living people
Sportspeople from Nizhny Novgorod
Olympic ski jumpers of Russia
Russian male ski jumpers
Ski jumpers at the 2006 Winter Olympics
Ski jumpers at the 2010 Winter Olympics
Ski jumpers at the 2014 Winter Olympics
Ski jumpers at the 2018 Winter Olympics
Universiade medalists in ski jumping
Universiade gold medalists for Russia
Universiade bronze medalists for Russia
Ski jumpers at the 2007 Winter Universiade